ISO 7001 ("public information symbols") is a standard published by the International Organization for Standardization that defines a set of pictograms and symbols for public information. The latest version, ISO 7001:2023, was published in February 2023. 

The set is the result of extensive testing in several countries and different cultures and have met the criteria for comprehensibility set up by the ISO. The design process and testing of ISO 7001 symbols is governed by ISO 22727:2007, Graphical symbols — Creation and design of public information symbols — Requirements. Common examples of public information symbols include those representing toilets, car parking, and information, and the International Symbol of Access.

History
ISO 7001 was first released in October 1980, with a single amendment in 1985. The second edition was released in February 1990, with one amendment in 1993. The third edition, the latest edition was released in November 2007, and has received four amendments in 2013, 2015, 2016 and 2017. The use of the symbols of ISO 7001 is recommended by the European standard EN 17210.

Implementation

ISO 7001 sets out some general guidelines for how symbols should be utilized, though large aspects are left up to the decision of the individual or entity designing signage for their facility. 
Symbols were created with the goal of being able to stand alone, without any accompanying text. However, text can be used to further aid in communicating the message, particularly in a situation where a custom symbol has been designed for a unique situation not covered by standard ISO 7001 symbols. Specific sizes for symbols are not provided in ISO 7001, though symbols are designed with the goal of being clearly understood regardless placed on something as small as a floor plan of a building or as a large as a giant sign hanging from a ceiling in a large open space.

While symbols are intended and recommended to be reproduced as presented in ISO 7001, the ISO acknowledges that situations may exist where a symbol should be modified due to national or cultural needs of a particular situation. Though key elements and the intent of the original symbol design must be retained to ensure it will be effective.

No colours are specified in ISO 7001, with the only guidance being to ensure clear contrast between the symbol and the sign background, as well as the environment the sign is in.
There is a clear recommendation against using colors specified in ISO 3864, due to possible confusion with safety signage using those colors. Of explicit concern is green and white, due to the risk of confusing a green and white 'PI PF 030' direction arrow symbol, for an ISO 7010 evacuation route arrow.

To avoid possible confusion with similar safety symbols of ISO 7010, symbols in ISO 7001 do not use the standard prohibition symbol consisting of a red circle with a red slash. Instead, either a red 'slash' or red 'cross' is used. A slash is used when an object is prohibited, and convers the entire symbol. A cross is used in situations where a behavior is prohibited, with the cross placed over the portion of the symbol depicting the behavior that is being prohibited rather than the entire symbol.

The slash and cross can be added to other symbols, such as a baggage cart to indicate 'no baggage carts'. ISO 7001 states that when symbols are designed, they should not have key elements that would be obstructed by the slash as positioned on the template provided in ISO 22727:2007. The slash or cross must be on top of the symbol, and should be red in color.

Symbols
The standard consists of 168 symbols, divided into six categories: public facilities, transport facilities, behaviour of the public, commercial facilities, tourism, cultural and heritage and sporting activities.

Public facilities
All symbol reference numbers in this category are prefixed with "PF", for Public Facilities.

Transportation facilities
All symbol reference numbers in this category are prefixed with "TF", for Transport Facilities.

Behaviour of the public
All symbol reference numbers in this category are prefixed with "BP", for Behaviour of the Public.

Commercial facilities
All symbol reference numbers in this category are prefixed with "CF", for Commercial Facilities.

Tourism, culture and heritage
All symbol reference numbers in this category are prefixed with "TC", for Tourism, Culture and heritage.

Sporting activities
All symbol reference numbers in this category are prefixed with "SA", for Sports Activities.

See also
 DOT pictograms - United States version of this standard.
 ISO 7010 - ISO Standard for safety symbols.

Notes

References

External links

The international language of ISO graphical symbols - A 2010 document published by the ISO educate about ISO graphical symbol standards ISO 7000 (Symbols for equipment), ISO 7001 (Symbols for public information), ISO 7010 (Symbols for safety signs).

07001
Symbols
Pictograms